Patti Smith Complete is a lyrics collection by Patti Smith, originally published in 1998.

Notes

External links 
 
 Patti Smith Complete at Random House
 Interview with Patti Smith on the book at Salon.com

Song books
Books by Patti Smith
1998 books
Doubleday (publisher) books